Most Likely to Survive: The Story of Matthew Faulkner's Miraculous Recovery from Traumatic Brain Injury is a non-fiction work written by Joe Kirchmyer and the book's subject, Matt Faulkner. The book was released in March 2013 and details a car accident in which Faulkner was a passenger. This occurred just a few months prior to his graduation from West Seneca West Senior High School (WSW) in 2009. Faulkner suffered from a severe traumatic brain injury (TBI) which left him in a coma for nearly two months. He spent three weeks on life support in the ICU at the Erie County Medical Center. He walked out of the hospital after 103 days and then received his high school diploma from West Seneca West just 12 days later.  The book's title is a reference to Faulkner being named "Most Likely to Succeed" by his high school graduating class shortly before the accident.

The book details Faulkner's life leading up to the accident, including his family life and having earned a place in the top ten percent of his high school graduating class, as well as admission to the all-college honors program at Canisius College[1]. A large majority of the book covers his hospitalization, rehabilitation, and his life in the years after the injury, including starting school at Canisius College in Buffalo, New York, and working towards his college graduation in 2013.

The book closes with a personal note from Faulkner about his aspirations for a new approach to TBI rehabilitation, including "our society to reach some type of recognition that brain injury does happen, and that we need to do more for the victims, especially the young people who suffer from such an awful occurrence." He goes on to establish his ambition of seeing better TBI rehabilitation and outcomes.

Release 
On March 23, 2013, the book was released with the documentary film, Recovery (2016), at the film's "grand Buffalo screening" which took place at University at Buffalo (UB) Center for the Arts[4]. The documentary film, which also documents Faulkner's accident, TBI and life after, was first test screened in Buffalo, New York in 2013, applied to film festivals in 2014, premiered at a film festival in 2015, and became publicly available in 2016. Additionally, the film has streamed for free on FilmFreeway since September 7, 2017.

Recovery was directed and produced by Ryan Monolopolus, who also graduated from WSW alongside Faulkner and remained friends with him following high school. Monolopolus was interviewed by the West Seneca Central School District for their Spring 2017 newsletter, and indicated that the film's debut screening at UB was "the largest screening for a student work ever at UB."

According to Monolopolus' resume, the film was allegedly selected as the "Best Documentary" at the "Speak Here, First" film festival in 2015, although no other reference to this can be found.

According to Monolopolus' website, Recovery was shot in collaboration with Mercy Flight and Erie County Medical Center (ECMC), and includes footage of a reenacted helicopter flight to ECMC, giving a portrayal of the Emergency Medical Service (EMS) air transport that was available to Faulkner to rush him to the hospital. The film had an approximate budget of $15,000.

Kirchmyer and Faulkner held several book signings after the initial release, notably one with a screening of the documentary film, Recovery at Canisius College in Regis North. The book remains available on Amazon.com in both paperback and eBook formats.

Community Engagement 
Prior to the release of the book and documentary film, Faulkner was interviewed by Melissa Holmes of WGRZ, a local news station in Buffalo, NY. Holmes interviewed both Faulkner and Monolopolus for the TV news feature in the Canisius College library. Monolopolus told Holmes that "Matt's recovery can be used as an example of how people move forward in multiple calibers. Not just from a medical injury, but how do people move on from anything that may be traumatic or jarring in their lives?"

In describing the experience and how the book and documentary could have an impact on others, Faulkner said that he hopes other people "...can get inspiration to know that what they think may be impossible could very well be possible."

Since the release of the book and documentary, Faulkner has spoken publicly on the topics of TBI, rehabilitation, motivation and recovery. In 2014, Monolopolus produced several TV ad spots for Mercy Flight, including one which featured Faulkner describing his accident and the Emergency Medical Service (EMS) service provided by Mercy Flight.

In 2018, Faulkner was a featured guest of Amy Zellmer on her podcast, Faces of TBI, during which he described the book and documentary as a "launching point" for him to share his experience with others, including students and nurses. He also indicated some of the past opportunities he has had to speak to groups, including at the 2015 WSW National Honor Society induction ceremony, as well as speaking to a graduate level physical therapy class at UB each year since 2014.

In 2019, he delivered the commencement address at both the West Seneca West (WSW), and East (WSE) Senior High School graduations, commenting that he works on "community awareness projects where I go to groups and speak about my experiences and rehabilitation and my experience with my brain injury and things like that. I’ve spoken to groups of nurses and other clinicians. I go to speak [with] students at UB in physical therapy every year."

Later in 2019, Faulkner participated in a video feature in support of Mercy Flight, describing his accident, the EMS support, his recovery and motivations. The video was featured at the 2019 "Beacon of Hope Gala" to raise money for their causes.

In November 2020, Faulkner gave a virtual presentation to the seniors in National Honor Society (NHS) at WSW. Presenting as both an alumnus and a former NHS board member, he shared his experience with adapting to significant change during his senior year of high school, reminding them to remain flexible with their plans as they are likely to change with the uncertainty of the COVID-19 pandemic.

In December 2020, Faulkner was recorded for two videos for the Brainwaves Video Anthology channel on YouTube. In the videos, Faulkner shared his story, and how he hopes to have an impact on the lives of others, just as so many others helped him.

In April 2021, Faulkner's "10 Years After Brain Injury: A Reflection" essay was reformatted and posted as a "Survivor Story" on the  website, SameYou, as well as highlighted on their Instagram page.  SameYou is a charity launched by actress, Emilia Clarke.

In March 2022, Faulkner spoke to the Physician's Assistant (PA) program students at Canisius College about his experience as a past patient of TBI, neurorehabilitation "...and what he thinks is necessary for severe TBI patients to have better outcomes and return to independent life."

Further Writing 
In March 2019, Faulkner posted an essay, titled: "Ten Years After Brain Injury: A Reflection" to WordPress to share his experience and commemorate the ten year anniversary of his TBI. In 2021, the blog post was reformatted and posted as a "Survivor Story" to the SameYou website, as well as highlighted on their Instagram page.  In the blog post, he shared his first thoughts about waking from the coma:

When I woke up alone on a cold hospital floor–the result of my intention to escape what I had thought was a nightmare–the first thing I realized was that my legs did not work like they used to. Screaming nurses swarmed to my attention, so I knew that something was wrong. The last thing I remembered was enjoying a fully functional and lazy Sunday, the final day of mid-winter break from my Senior year of high school. Apparently, months had gone by–the calendar on the wall already had the first few days of May crossed off.

The nightmare was real. There were things that I could not remember happening and there was no changing that, no matter how difficult that was for me to grasp. That moment, on the floor, is when I tell people I woke up from the coma, although my doctor would say differently. Two weeks prior, after following the simple command of "squeeze my finger," I was declared "awake."

That moment, on the floor, I had to accept that everyone around me was telling the truth when they said that I was in an accident.

I had suffered a Traumatic Brain Injury (TBI).

Further, he describes the details of his injuries, emergency medical care and prognosis:

In addition to being entirely unconscious (Glasgow Coma Scale of 3-4), I was not breathing, in decerebrate posturing, and in cardiac arrest. The team of first responders, most of whom volunteer firefighters, were responsible for performing CPR, intubating me, and administering epinephrine at the scene to jump-start my heart. Once I was stabilized, they alerted Mercy Flight of WNY to rapidly transport me to the TICU at Erie County Medical Center (ECMC). The brilliant attending neurosurgeon, Dr. Gregory Bennett MD, effectively mitigated the bleeding and swelling inside my brain, which was due to intracranial bleeding and an intraparenchymal contusion. The procedure helped prevent further brain damage from brain herniation and increased my chances of having a "good" outcome, or being able to live without constant care. The chances of that happening were about 1 in 10, according to prognostic models. But first I had to survive–a mere 20% likelihood. In the first week, my parents were advised that they may have to make a decision to remove me from life support in the near future.

However grim the prognosis, I survived the acute stages and a serious lung infection. I spent exactly three weeks in the TICU before I was stable enough to be transferred and admitted to the "Coma Stim" rehabilitation program under the outstanding care of my physiatrist, Dr. Gary Wang MD, PhD. It would be another three weeks until I was officially declared awake.

Faulkner writes further about his rehabilitation, leaving the hospital and preparing for college. He then includes a follow-up about his life in the years following the release of the book and documentary film, Recovery.

References 

American memoirs
People with traumatic brain injuries
Buffalo, New York